The firstborn or firstborn son (Hebrew בְּכוֹר bəḵōr) is an important concept in Judaism. The role of firstborn son carries significance in the redemption of the first-born son, in the allocation of a double portion of the inheritance, and in the prophetic application of "firstborn" to the nation of Israel.

Etymology and usage
The semitic root B-K-R means "early" or "first" in Ancient Near East Semitic languages. Biblical Hebrew contains various verbs from the B-K-R stem with this association. The plural noun bikkurim (vegetable first fruits) also derives from this root. The masculine noun bekhor, firstborn, is used of sons, as "Canaan begat Sidon his firstborn" (Genesis 10:15), whereas the feminine noun, and female equivalent, is bekirah (בְּכִירָה), firstborn daughter. Derived from bechor is the qualitative noun bekhorah (בְּכוֹרָה) ("birthright"), related to primogeniture.

Hebrew Bible
The earliest account of primogeniture to be widely known in modern times involved Isaac's son Jacob being born second and Isaac's son, Esau being born first and entitled to the birthright, but eventually selling it to Isaac's second son, Jacob, for a small amount of food A similar transfer is shown by the writer of 1 Chronicles 5:1-2 where, although the tribe of Judah prevailed above their brethren, nevertheless the birthright, the double portion of two tribal allotments, was Joseph's.

According to the Law of Moses, the firstborn may be either the firstborn of his father, who is entitled to receive a double portion of his father's inheritance (compared to the other siblings), (Deuteronomy 21:17) or the firstborn of his mother.  provides inheritance rules preventing the husband with more than one wife from leaving property to the son of the favoured wife.

The Law of Moses elsewhere commands the Israelites to give (perhaps "dedicate") "the firstborn of your sons" to Yahweh, and other similar verses have a requirement to "sanctify" all the firstborn.

Israel as God's firstborn
In Exodus, Moses is instructed to say to Pharaoh "Thus saith the LORD, Israel is my son, my firstborn.

Animal firstborn or "firstlings"
Aside from the sacrifice of the "firstlings" by Abel, the Law of Moses also proscribes special distinction of animal firstborn.

Death of the firstborn of Egypt
The Egyptians also attached significance to primogeniture and birthright. The death of Pharaoh and the Egyptians' firstborn sons at the first Passover is direct recompense for God's identification of Israel as his own firstborn.

The Second Temple and Dead Sea scrolls
The understanding of Israel as the national firstborn of God is found in the Dead Sea scrolls 1Q/4Q "Instruction," and probably 4Q369 the "Prayer of Enosh", as well as in Ben Sira.

Hellenistic and Diaspora Judaism
The concept of the firstborn was heavily present in Hellenistic Judaism among the Second Temple Jewish diaspora. In the Septuagint, Israel, then Ephraim, are God's prototokos (πρωτότοκος) "firstborn." The use of "firstborn" is taken further along figurative lines. In the pseudepigraphical Testament of Abraham disease is personified as the prototokos "firstborn" of Thanatos, the personification of death. In Joseph and Asenath the converted Egyptian princess Asenath prepares to marry Joseph, the prototokos "firstborn" of the god of Israel. Philo of Alexandria comments on the inheritance rites of the firstborn in Deuteronomy, greatly emphasizing and embellishing the superiority of Mosaic Law over Egyptian models.

Rabbinical interpretation
According to the pidyon haben (redemption of the firstborn), if the father and mother are both Israelites, the firstborn is required to be redeemed from a Kohen. The firstborn of a mother is referred to in the Bible (Exodus 13:2) as one who "opens the womb" of his mother. Therefore, the firstborn of the father exclusively, although considered as a firstborn regarding his father's inheritance, is not considered as a firstborn regarding the requirement to be redeemed, as the mother's womb has already been opened by his half-sibling, the firstborn of his mother. Thus, the Shulchan Aruch rules that only a first born of the mother is required to be redeemed.

There is a matter of dispute among the poskim (early rabbinic authorities) regarding whether a first-born son who is a Jewish convert (whose biological mother is not considered to be his mother) or from a caesarean section has the laws of a bechor.

The firstborn's service to the Jewish people
Originally, the firstborn of every Jewish family was intended to serve as a priest in the temple in Jerusalem as priests to the Jewish people but they lost this role after the sin of the golden calf when this privilege was transferred to the male descendants of Aaron. However, according to some, this role will be given back to the firstborn in a Third Temple when Messiah comes. Until this time, they say, a firstborn son still has certain other roles. Besides receiving double the father's inheritance and requiring a pidyon haben, a firstborn son is supposed to fast on the eve of Passover and in the absence of a Levite, a bechor washes the hands of the Kohen prior to blessing the Israelites (see: Priestly Blessing).

Animal firstborns
In the Hebrew Bible, the feminine plural noun bechorot is used to describe "firstlings" of a flock. In rabbinical Hebrew, the masculine noun bechor is also used of the first born animal to open the womb of its mother. The animal "firstborn beast" (Hebrew bechor behema בכור בהמה) is listed as one of the twenty-four priestly gifts. Today, when there is no Temple in Jerusalem, most Jewish believers do not give first-born animals to Kohanim. Instead it is customary to sell the mother animal to a non-Jew before it gives birth to the firstborn, and then buy back both the animal and its firstborn.

Other Abrahamic religions
The importance of the literal firstborn son is not as greatly developed in Christianity and Islam as it is in Judaism. 
 Christianity applies the concept of firstborn to Jesus of Nazareth as "firstborn from the dead", and adopts the  Septuagint terminology prototokoi (plural) to describe the church as "firstborns."
 Muslim scholars traditionally consider Ishmael as the firstborn of Abraham mentioned in Qur'an 37.103. However, Islamic law contains no preference for the firstborn son.

References

Hebrew Bible words and phrases
Jewish society
Jewish law and rituals
Kinship and descent